is a stadium in Iwaki, Fukushima, Japan. It opened in 1995 and holds 30,000 people. Its design was based on that of Chiba Marine Stadium, and it is used primarily used for baseball. The stadium hosts high school, university and amateur baseball and softball events, and one-two professional baseball games per year. It hosted one NPB All-Star Game in 2013.

External links 

 
Iwaki City home page

Baseball venues in Japan
Sports venues in Fukushima Prefecture
Iwaki, Fukushima
Sports venues completed in 1995
1995 establishments in Japan